Roland Alfred Luedtke (January 4, 1924 – July 22, 2005) was an American politician who served as the 31st lieutenant governor of Nebraska from 1979 to 1983.

Luedtke was born in Lincoln, Nebraska, on January 4, 1924, to Alfred C. and Carolina (Senne) Luedtke.  After graduating from Lincoln High School in 1942 he served in World War II in the U.S. Army.  He then attended University of Nebraska–Lincoln and received a bachelor's degree in 1949 followed by a law degree.

Luedtke served as  Nebraska Deputy Secretary of State from 1953 to 1959.  In November 1966 he was first elected to the Nebraska Legislature.  He became Speaker of the Legislature in 1977.

He was elected lieutenant governor and served in that position from 1979 to 1983.  He was next elected as the mayor of Lincoln, serving from 1983 to 1987.

Luedtke married Helen D. Snyder on December 1, 1951, and they had two sons.  He was diagnosed with Alzheimer's disease in his later years, and died on July 22, 2005.

References

1924 births
2005 deaths
Lieutenant Governors of Nebraska
Speakers of the Nebraska Legislature
American people of German descent
Mayors of Lincoln, Nebraska
Republican Party Nebraska state senators
Military personnel from Nebraska
20th-century American politicians
United States Army personnel of World War II